The Marble Kiosk was a structure directly located at the banks of the Bosphorus of Topkapı Palace in Istanbul, and served as a pleasure building for the Ottoman Padishah. It was located next to the Cannon Gate (Top kapı), both structures are today lost.

Possible parts of Marble Kiosk

Literature 
 Fanny Davis. Palace of Topkapi in Istanbul. 1970. ASIN B000NP64Z2

External links 

Topkapı Palace